Collier Mountain is a mountain in the Ridge and Valley region of the Appalachian Mountains, located in Allegany County, Maryland.

Coordinates
(N. 39°37' W. 78°41')

References 
 United States Geological Survey
 Maryland Geological survey

Landforms of Allegany County, Maryland
Mountains of Maryland